Theoctistus or Theoktistos is a Greek name derived from θεος theos, "god", and κτίσμα ktisma, "creation, edifice, foundation", the resulting combination being translated to "creation of God", "godly creation".

Theoctistus or  Theoktistos can refer to, chronologically:

Theoctistus of Caesarea (2nd-3rd centuries), bishop; see Origen
Theoctistus of Alexandria (3rd century), a sea captain, martyr, saint, and companion of Faustus, Abibus and Dionysius of Alexandria (martyred 250)
Theoctistus of Palestine (died 451 or 467), aka Venerable Theoctistus (Theoktistos) of Palestine, Byzantine monk, hermit and Orthodox saint, active in Palestine, companion of Saint Euthymius the Great with whom he established a monastery, commemorated on September 3
Monk Theoktistos (died 800), the hegumen of Sicilian Kucuma, commemorated as an Eastern Orthodox saint.
Theoktistos (magistros) (fl. 802–821), senior Byzantine official
Theoctistus of Naples, Duke of Naples in 818-821
Theoktistos Bryennios (fl. ca. 842), Byzantine general
Theoktistos, chief minister and regent of the Byzantine Empire from 842 to 855
Theoktistos the Stoudite, 14th-century Byzantine ecclesiastical writer
Teoctist I of Moldavia (ca. 1410-1477), Metropolitan of Moldavia from 1453 to 1477
Teoctist Arăpaşu (born Toader Arăpaşu; 1915-2007), Patriarch of the Romanian Orthodox Church from 1986 to 2007